Greiffenberg may refer to:

Gryfów Śląski, Poland
Greiffenberg, Brandenburg, Germany